Dr. Jagdish Sharma (born 1 October 1950) is an Indian politician. He was a vice president of the Hindustani Awam Morcha, a political party. His wife Shanti Sharma was MLA from Ghosi. His son Rahul Kumar from Janata Dal (United) the party which has served in defence ministry of India became MLA from Ghosi constituency. After being found guilty in criminal conspiracy to save bureaucrats involved in Fodder Scam, Sharma was sentenced to four years rigorous imprisonment and disqualified as an MP along with RJD Supremo Lalu Prasad Yadav.

Political career
Sharma entered in politics with the Bihar Movement, also known as JP Movement, led by Jayaprakash Narayan in 1974.

See also
 Politics of Bihar
 List of members of the 15th Lok Sabha of India

References

1950 births
Living people
Janata Dal (United) politicians
India MPs 2004–2009
India MPs 2009–2014
Magadh University alumni
Indian prisoners and detainees
Indian politicians convicted of crimes
Lok Sabha members from Bihar
People from Jehanabad district
Criminals from Bihar
Corruption in Bihar
Bihar MLAs 1977–1980
Bihar MLAs 1980–1985
Bihar MLAs 1985–1990
Bihar MLAs 1990–1995
Bihar MLAs 1995–2000
Bihar MLAs 2000–2005
Hindustani Awam Morcha politicians
Indian politicians disqualified from office